Psari (Greek: Ψάρι, meaning "fish") may refer to the following places in Greece:

Psari, Arcadia, a village in Arcadia, part of the municipal unit Iraia 
Psari, Elis, a settlement in Elis, part of the municipal unit Vouprasia 
Psari, Corinthia, a settlement in Corinthia, part of the municipal unit Stymfalia
Psari, Messenia, a settlement in Messenia, part of the municipal unit Dorio
Psari (mountain), a mountaintop in Laconia